The 1993 Formula One Indoor Trophy took place on December 4–5 at the Bologna Motor Show. The winner was Rubens Barrichello in a Jordan-Hart.

Participants

Results

Preliminary rounds

Knockout stage

References

 Bologna Sprint - The GEL Motorsport Information Page

Formula One Indoor Trophy
Formula One Indoor Trophy